Virginie Favre (born September 6, 1982) is a Swiss freestyle skier. She is the reigning FIS World Champion with her gold from 2013 FIS Freestyle World Ski Championships.

She is the President of the organizing committee for the 2020 Winter Youth Olympics in Lausanne.

References

External links
 FIS-Ski.com Profile

1982 births
Living people
Swiss female freestyle skiers
Freestyle skiers at the 2014 Winter Olympics
Olympic freestyle skiers of Switzerland
Presidents of the Organising Committees for the Olympic Games
Swiss sports executives and administrators
21st-century Swiss women